Guy Farley (born 5 February 1963) is a British musician and composer based in Battersea, south London.

Farley is a film composer whose work includes orchestral scores, world music, contemporary sound design and has also collaborated with pop artists and producers.

Recent works by Farley include Downfall (2015), A Good American (2015), and Exodus to Shanghai (2015). His most famous works include soundtracks to: Modigliani (2004), Wake of Death (2004), Cashback (2006), The Flock (2007) and Land of the Blind (2006). Farley has an extensive list of other films, television series and documentaries  that he has composed music for.

Career
Farley started his career as a musician, composer and conductor in the early 1980s. His first significant credits in the film industry saw him work on the sound for the horror film ‘The Gardener’ (1998), followed by ‘Darkness Falls’ (1999) and then ‘Sorted’ in the year 2000.  During this time he also worked on the music for several documentaries. Over the next 10 years, as well as working on a number of other films, he also worked on and in some cases was the sole composer for several feature films, television films, and documentaries. He also, however, worked with a number of popular music acts, including the Sugababes, Leona Lewis, Duran Duran, and the Appletons among others.
Farley also has a number of advertising credits, including Lloyds TSB, Lynx, Gordon's Gin and Galaxy. For his efforts, in 2013 he was nominated for the “Best Original Composition in Cinema in advertising” and the following year he was a winner at the Music and Sound awards for “Best Original Composition in TV Advertising” and “Best Original Composition in Cinema Advertising” as well as receiving a nomination for the  “Best Sync - re-recording”.

He is currently scoring a comedy called 'The hot Potato' starring Ray Winstone In 2017, Farley was one of the executive producers and composers, alongside Craigie Dodds, on Britain's Got Talent 2017 winner and classical musician Tokio Myers' debut album, entitled Our Generation.

Awards
In 2014, Farley was nominated for 4 Music and Sound Awards.

References

External links
  at Reviewgraveyard.com
 

Living people
British composers
British film score composers
1963 births
La-La Land Records artists